College baseball is baseball that is played on the intercollegiate level at institutions of higher education. In comparison to football and basketball, college competition in the United States plays a smaller role in developing professional players, as baseball's professional minor leagues are more extensive, with a greater history of supplying players to MLB. Moving directly from high school to the professional level is more common in baseball than in football or basketball. However, if players do opt to enroll at a four-year college to play baseball, they must complete three years to regain professional eligibility, unless they reach age 21 before starting their third year of college. Players who enroll at junior colleges (i.e., two-year institutions) regain eligibility after one year at that level. In the 2020 season, which was abbreviated due to the COVID-19 pandemic, there were 300 NCAA Division I teams in the United States (including schools transitioning from Division II to Division I).

As with most other U.S. intercollegiate sports, competitive college baseball is played under the auspices of either the NCAA, the NAIA, the NJCAA, the CCCAA, or the NWAC. The NCAA writes the rules of play, while each sanctioning body supervises season-ending tournaments. The final rounds of the NCAA Division I tournament is known as the Men's College World Series (MCWS); while each of the three levels of competition sanctioned by the NCAA holds a championship tournament, the "Men's College World Series" branding is reserved strictly for the final round of the Division I tournament. The CWS takes place in Omaha, Nebraska in June, following the regular season. The playoff bracket for Division I consists of 64 teams, with four teams playing at each of 16 regional sites (in a double-elimination format). The 16 winners advance to the Super Regionals at eight sites, played head-to-head in a best-of-three series. The eight winners then advance to the MCWS, a double-elimination tournament (actually two separate four-team brackets) to determine the two national finalists. The finalists play a best-of-three series to determine the Division I national champion. The most recent Men's College World Series winner is Ole Miss.

History
The first intercollegiate baseball game took place in Pittsfield, Massachusetts, on July 1, 1859, between squads representing Amherst College and Williams College. Amherst won, 73–32. This game was one of the last played under an earlier version of the game known as "Massachusetts rules", which prevailed in New England until the "Knickerbocker Rules" (or "New York Rules") developed in the 1840s gradually became accepted. The first ever nine-man team college baseball game under the Knickerbocker Rules still in use today was played in New York on November 3, 1859, between the Fordham Rose Hill Baseball Club of St. John's College (now Fordham University) against The College of St. Francis Xavier, now known as Xavier High School.

Students at many college began organizing games between colleges, particularly after the Civil War, first in the northeastern United States but quickly throughout the country.  By the late 1870s, several northeastern schools were playing regular home and home series.  The team with the best record claimed a "National Championship."  Arguments over professional and graduate players led to the creation of the American College Base Ball Association in late 1879, consisting of six northeastern schools which sought to govern such issues and organize games.  This organization lasted until 1887, when it dissolved in acrimony and waves of realignment.  The Western Conference and Southern Intercollegiate Athletic Association were formed in the 1890s as multi-sport conferences.  The first tournament to name a national champion was held at the 1893 World's Fair in Chicago, resulting in Yale being crowned champion.  No other such tournament was held until the first Men's College World Series in 1947.

Recent growth

Traditionally, college baseball has been played in the early part of the year, with a relatively short schedule and during a time when cold (and/or rainy) weather hinders the ability for games to be played, particularly in the northern and midwestern parts of the U.S. These and other factors have historically led colleges and universities across the nation to effectively consider baseball a minor sport, both in scholarships as well as money and other points of emphasis.

College baseball has grown phenomenally in popularity since the 1980s, as coaches and athletic directors in warm-weather regions of the nation began to recognize the unrealized potential appeal of the sport. These coaches went out and aggressively recruited the sport to potential athletes, as well as made various upgrades to their programs; such as bigger and better stadiums, more money for staff and support salaries, and promotions.

As these efforts resulted in better players and overall programs, more television and print media coverage began to emerge. The ESPN family of networks have greatly increased television coverage of the NCAA playoffs and the College World Series since 2003.

Soon, in many warm-weather regions, baseball came to be considered a major sport, approaching the level of football and basketball.  And even non-warm weather schools started to recognize baseball's potential and began to put considerably more emphasis on it. Nebraska, Notre Dame, and Oregon State are three notable examples of cold (or rainy) weather schools with very successful programs. The first two made the College World Series when warm-weather schools placed major emphasis on baseball as well as had the advantage of playing earlier and more games because of favorable climates. Oregon State won back-to-back national championships in 2006 and 2007; at that time, arch rival Oregon had been without baseball for a quarter-century, having dropped its program in 1981. Many credit the Beavers' success as a primary factor in the University of Oregon's later decision to revive baseball in 2009.

Before the Hubert H. Humphrey Metrodome was demolished in early 2014, Minnesota took advantage of it to play the majority of their games, including hosting a prestigious preseason tournament. With the 2010 departure of the MLB Minnesota Twins for the new Target Field, the school hoped to use the Metrodome for future Big Ten tournaments and bids on the NCAA tournament. Along with that, many smaller conferences (not in Division I) played games at the Metrodome during February in order to keep up with schools in warm-weather locations. While the Metrodome's replacement, U.S. Bank Stadium, was designed mainly for the NFL's Minnesota Vikings, it has movable seating banks that allow it to be configured for baseball.

For 2008 and succeeding seasons, the NCAA mandated the first ever start date for Division I baseball, thirteen weeks before the selection of the NCAA tournament field, which takes place on Memorial Day.

Collegiate rules
The rules of college baseball are similar to the Official Baseball Rules. Exceptions include the following:
 The bat may be made of wood, or a composite material that meets NCAA standards. Since the 2011 season, composite bats have been required to pass the "Bat-Ball Coefficient of Restitution" (BBCOR) test.
 The designated hitter rule is used. In addition, a player may serve as both pitcher and DH at the same time and may remain in one position when removed in the other.
 One or both ends of a doubleheader are sometimes seven innings in length. However, the NCAA has recently tightened the interpretation of what constitutes a regulation game, encouraging schools to play as many nine-inning games as possible. Seven-inning games may be played on the final day of a conference series, or if the two teams in a non-conference match will play two games in one day, often to make up a game that could not be played earlier in the year due to inclement weather.
 A mercy rule may be in use, which terminates play when one team is ahead by 10 or more runs after seven innings (6½ innings if the home team is winning). In games that are scheduled for seven innings the rule takes effect in the fifth. This rule is not used in NCAA tournament games. Several conferences institute this rule only on Sundays or the final day of a conference series so that the visiting team can travel early. In some conferences, the mercy rule may also be used to end such games in order to start the next tournament game sooner.
 There is an automatic ejection for maliciously running into a defender who is trying to tag a runner or execute a force out. An automatic double play may also be called if a player slides into a base in an attempt to take out the defensive player who is trying to throw the ball to complete a double play.
 In televised games and in tournament games, instant replay may be used to determine if a slide was malicious.

Metal versus wood bat
Though a wood bat is legal in NCAA competition, players overwhelmingly prefer and use a metal bat. The metal bat was implemented in college baseball in 1975. Use of a metal bat is somewhat controversial. Supporters of an aluminum or composite bat note that it can increase offensive performance, as the speed of a ball off a metal bat is generally faster than off a wood bat. Those against metal, and for wood, argue that a metal bat is not safe to use, and that a metal bat doesn't prepare players for the next level, as professional baseball uses a wood bat exclusively. In the 2011 season the NCAA changed the requirements for a metal bat, reducing the maximum allowed exit speed in a way that is said to produce a feeling more like a wood bat. As a result, in 2011 there was a drop-off in overall "long" drives or home runs relative to past years.

Draft process
All players resident in the U.S. and its territories, plus Canada, are eligible to be selected in Major League Baseball's Rule 4 Draft upon graduating from high school. However, once a player enrolls in a four-year college or university, he is not allowed to be drafted (or re-drafted) until completing three years of school or reaching age 21, whichever comes first. By contrast, players who enroll in junior colleges (i.e., two-year institutions) are eligible for selection at any time. The Rule 4 Draft of eligible college and high school players consists of 20 rounds, most recently reduced from 40 after the 2019 edition. Despite MLB's draft being considerably longer than that of the NFL or NBA, only about 9.1% of all NCAA senior baseball players are drafted by an MLB team.

One of the biggest controversies with the draft and these amateur athletes is the use of agents. There have been many cases of college athletes consulting or hiring an agent prematurely in direct violation of NCAA rules. The NCAA came up with the "no agent rule" as a result of this, claiming it was to benefit the amateur athletes.  The rule states that "[a]n individual shall be ineligible for participation in an intercollegiate sport if he or she has agreed (orally or in writing) to be represented by an agent for the purpose of marketing his or her athletics ability or reputation in that sport". Representation of an agent is considered to be any direct contact with the professional team during the contract negotiations. This contact can be made many different ways, whether through direct conversation, via mail or through the telephone. This rule is strongly enforced by the NCAA and has harsh consequences if broken. Recent changes to NCAA rules regarding compensation to college athletes for the use of their name, image, and likeness (NIL) have clarified that players can sign with agents to negotiate endorsement deals without loss of eligibility, though not for negotiating with professional teams.

Recruitment process
The recruitment process is similar to that of the Major League Draft in that a high school athlete is taking the next step in his career. The NCAA places restrictions on the coaches that are trying to convince athletes to come play for them and attend their university. College baseball programs are only allowed to offer a limited number of scholarships each year, so the process of earning a scholarship is quite competitive. Baseball is classified by the NCAA as an "equivalency" sport, meaning that limits on athletic financial aid are set to the equivalent of a fixed number of full scholarships. Division I schools are allowed the equivalent of 11.7 full scholarships; Division II schools, only 9.0. Schools generally choose to award multiple partial scholarships rather than exclusively full scholarships. In Division I, the NCAA also limits the total number of players receiving baseball-related financial aid to 27, and also requires that each of these players receive athletic aid equal to at least 25% of a full scholarship. The 25% rule does not apply to schools that offer aid based solely on financial need (most notably Ivy League members), and also does not apply to a player in his final year of athletic eligibility who has not previously received athletically related aid in baseball at any college. A long-standing official NCAA rules interpretation also allows schools to count aid that would otherwise be exempt by NCAA rule (such as purely academic awards) toward the 25% limit, as long as it also is included in the calculations for the team equivalency limit.

Before September 1 of a potential college player's 11th grade year, it is illegal for a college program to give any kind of recruiting materials to the prospect. A phone call is not even permitted to the prospect until July 1 of the student's 11th grade year. Once the player is committed to the school of his choice, he must sign his letter of intent during one of several signing periods. The early signing period for a Division I baseball player is between November 8 and 15; the late signing period dates for these players are April 11 to August 1.

Substance policies
The substance policies for college baseball are very strict and set by the NCAA. There is a set list of substances a college baseball player is forbidden to put in his body, and there is severe punishment for those that defy it, whether it would be intentional or unintentional. There is a very long list of these substances, including alcohol, marijuana, anabolic steroids, and heroin, to name just a few. These substances fit into categories such as stimulants, anabolic steroids, diuretics, street drugs, hormones, anti-estrogens, and more. Failure to pass scheduled or random drug tests can result in ineligibility.

Attendance records

Top college baseball crowds of all time

Top 25 on-campus college baseball crowds of all time

Longest game in college baseball history

The longest college baseball game was played between Texas and Boston College on May 30, 2009, during the NCAA Division I Baseball Championship regional tournament at Austin, Texas. Texas – which was designated the visiting team despite playing on its home field – won the game, 3–2, in 25 innings. The game lasted seven hours three minutes.

Video gaming

After losing its license for Major League Baseball, EA Sports released MVP 06: NCAA Baseball, the first college baseball video game. A second game, MVP 07: NCAA Baseball, was also released before the series was discontinued due to low sales.

See also
List of NCAA Division I baseball programs
2022 NCAA Division I baseball season
NCAA Division I Baseball Championship
Men's College World Series
NCAA Division II Baseball Championship
NCAA Division III Baseball Championship
NAIA Baseball World Series
JUCO World Series
NCBA World Series division D1 championship
NCBA World Series division D2 championship
USA Baseball
Amateur baseball in the United States
NCAA Division I college baseball team statistics
National College Baseball Hall of Fame

List of college baseball awards
List of college baseball career home run leaders
List of collegiate summer baseball leagues
List of Division I colleges that do not sponsor baseball

World University Baseball Championship
Baseball at the Summer Universiade
College athletics
College rivalries

Footnotes

References
General
 Arkell, Thomas J. "Agent Interference With College Athletics: What Agents Can and Cannot Do and What Institutions Should Do In Response." 4 Sports Law. J. (1997): 147–180. Web. July 21, 2010.
 "College Baseball Teams." The Baseball Cube. n.p. n.d. Web. July 20, 2010.
 Green, Gary A., Frank D. Uryasz, Todd A. Petr, Corey D. Bray. "NCAA Study of Substance Use and Abuse Habits of College Student-Athletes" Clinical Journal of Sport Medicine 11.1 (January 2001): P.51-56. Web. July 21, 2010.
 Greenwald, Richard M., Lori H. Penna, and Joseph J. Crisco. "Differences in Batted Ball Speeds With Wood and Aluminum Baseball Bats: A Batting Cage Study." Journal of Applied Biomechanics 17 (2001): 241–252. Web. July 20, 2010.
 Karcher, Richard T. "The NCAA's Regulations Related to the Use of Agents in the Sport of Baseball: Are the Rules Detrimental to the Best Interest of the Amateur Athlete?" 7 Vand. J. Ent. L. & Prac. (2004–2005): 215–232. Web. July 21, 2010.
 Newlin, Clint. "Estimated Probability of Competing in Athletics Beyond the High School Interscholastic Level." National Interscholastic Athletic Association. n.p. April 20, 2010. Web. July 22, 2010.
 Schlegel, John. "Texas wins NCAA record 25-inning game", MLB.com (MLB Advanced Media, L.P.), May 31, 2009.
 Traub, James. "Take Me Out to the Picket Line." WALL ST. J., A12. July 21, 2010.
 "2009 NCAA Div. I Baseball College World Series Bracket" (in column 1 (Regionals), click on Austin box; then click on Texas–BC box), NCAA.com (NCAA).
 A night to remember San Diego Union-Tribune (March 12, 2008)
 BaseballAmerica.com: College
 Minnesota-Louisiana Tech Boxscore Minnesota Athletic Communications (March 27, 2010)
 NCAA Baseball History. Historical Facts And Information Relating To College Baseball
 Record Crowd Watches No. 15 Georgia Tech Top No. 12 Georgia, 12–5 Georgia Tech Sports Information (May 11, 2004)
Specific

External links

 College baseball at NCAA, NAIA, CCCAA, NCCAA, NJCAA, USCAA
 National (Collegiate) Club Baseball Association
 College Baseball Daily
 CSTV.com – College baseball polls
 College Baseball Nation